Zoran Banković (born 22 September 1956) is a former Serbian footballer.

Club career
Born in Leskovac, SR Serbia, back then part of Yugoslavia, Zoran Banković played for several Yugoslav First League teams such as FK Vardar, Red Star Belgrade and FK Radnički Niš.

References

External sources
stats

Living people
1956 births
Serbian footballers
Yugoslav footballers
Yugoslav First League players
FK Vardar players
Red Star Belgrade footballers
FK Radnički Niš players
OFK Beograd players
Sportspeople from Leskovac
Association football defenders